Andrew Forbes (born January 18, 1997) is an American football guard for the Cleveland Browns of the National Football League (NFL). He played college football at Southeast Missouri State.

Professional career

Cleveland Browns
Forbes was selected by the Cleveland Browns in the sixth round with the 189th overall pick in of the 2019 NFL Draft. Forbes signed his rookie contract with the Browns on May 2, 2019. Forbes was placed on injured reserve with a knee injury on September 1, 2019. He was activated off injured reserve on November 14, 2019.

Forbes exercised his option to opt-out of the 2020 season on July 29, 2020, due to the COVID-19 pandemic.

On August 31, 2021, Forbes was placed on season-ending injured reserve with a knee injury.

On September 5, 2022, Forbes was waived by the Browns.

Detroit Lions
Forbes was claimed off waivers by the Detroit Lions. He was waived on October 1, 2022.

Cleveland Browns (second stint)
On October 3, 2022, Forbes was claimed off waivers by the Cleveland Browns.

References

External links
Cleveland Browns bio
Southeast Missouri State Redhawks bio

1997 births
Living people
American football offensive guards
Cleveland Browns players
Detroit Lions players
People from Bonne Terre, Missouri
Players of American football from Missouri
Southeast Missouri State Redhawks football players
Sportspeople from Greater St. Louis